Herbie Mann Live at Newport is a live album by American jazz flautist Herbie Mann recorded at the Newport Jazz Festival in 1963 for the Atlantic label.

Reception

AllMusic awarded the album 4 stars with its review by Scott Yanow calling it a "well-played program".

Track listing
 "Soft Winds" (Benny Goodman, Fred Royal) - 7:40
 "Desafinado" (Antônio Carlos Jobim, Newton Mendonça) - 7:39
 "Samba de Orfeu" (Luiz Bonfá) - 6:09
 "Don't You Know" (Ben Tucker) - 10:49 	
 "Garota de Ipanema" (Jobim, Vinicius de Moraes) - 8:05

Personnel 
Herbie Mann - flute
Dave Pike - vibraphone
Don Friedman - piano 
Attila Zoller - guitar
Ben Tucker - bass
Bobby Thomas - drums
Willie Bobo, Carlos "Patato" Valdes - percussion (tracks 1, 3 & 4)

References 

1963 live albums
Herbie Mann live albums
albums produced by Nesuhi Ertegun
Atlantic Records live albums
Albums recorded at the Newport Jazz Festival